The Sinhagad Express is an Intercity Express train which plies daily between the cities of Pune and Mumbai in India. It is operated by the Indian Railways and comes under the Central Railway zone and is one of the six point-to-point express trains which carry thousands of passengers daily between Pune and Mumbai, the other five being Pragati Express, Deccan Queen, Deccan Express, Indrayani Express and Intercity Express.

Sinhgad Express is named after the fort of Sinhgad which means a Lion's Fort located in Pune.

Schedule
Sinhagad Express departs from Pune Junction at 06:05 IST and reaches Chhatrapati Shivaji Maharaj Terminus, Mumbai at 09.55 IST. It leaves Chhatrapati Shivaji Maharaj Terminus, Mumbai on the same day at 17:50 IST and reaches Pune Junction at 21:50 IST on the same day. It covers a distance of 192 km in one direction during its journey. Its train number is 11010 while travelling from Pune to Mumbai, whereas the train number is 11009 during the return journey from Mumbai to Pune.

Routeing

Traction
This train is hauled by a Kalyan-based WCAM-3 or WCAM-2 locomotive end to end.

Currently now this train is hauled by a Ajni-based WAP-7 locomotive end to end.

Gallery

See also
 Mumbai–Pune Passenger
 Dedicated Intercity trains of India
 Sister trains Mumbai–Pune:

References

External links
 - Website of the Indian Railways
 11009 Sinhagad Express Schedule
 11010 Sinhagad Express Schedule
 Sinhgad Express Time Table

Transport in Pune
Transport in Mumbai
Mumbai–Pune trains
Named passenger trains of India
Rail transport in Maharashtra
Express trains in India